Frans Demol (19 August 1895 in Beersel – 14 February 1966), nicknamed Protje, was a former Belgian international footballer and manager of Belgium.

Player career
Having starting his youth career in Union Saint-Gilloise, Demol played also for Union's first squad from 1914 on. In his first professional year, he would already lift the Belgian Cup. With the same team (in the meantime named Union Royale Saint-Gilloise), he also won the Belgian Championship for clubs nine years later. In 1927, he changed Union after 176 games and 19 goals for Third Division team RC Tienen as coach, with which he celebrated promotion to Second Division in 1931.

During his last years in First Division with Union Royale Saint-Gilloise, he also gathered 19 caps for the Belgium national football team. He also got selected for the Belgian 1924 Olympic team, but did not play in Paris.

Managerial career
Frans Demol became a football manager in 1927 for RC Tienen and in 1944 for Belgium. Under his supervision the national side won twice, drew twice and suffered four losses. In 1946, Englishman Bill Gormlie became his successor as coach of Belgium. Just as for his player career, Demol's career as football manager ended up in Tienen; he would lead this team during only one year.

Player palmares
Union Saint-Gilloise
Belgian First Division
Winner (1): 1922–23
Belgian Cup
Winner (1): 1914

RC Tienen
Belgian Third Division
Winner (1): 1931
Belgian Second Division
Winner (1): 1937

Belgium national football team
19 selections
Coupe Van den Abeele (friendly cup tournament between Belgium and the Netherlands in Belgium)
Winner (1): 1927 
Co-Winner (1): 1926

References

External links
 

1895 births
1966 deaths
Belgian footballers
Association football defenders
K.V.K. Tienen-Hageland players
Belgian football managers
Belgium international footballers
Footballers at the 1924 Summer Olympics
Olympic footballers of Belgium
Belgium national football team managers
People from Beersel
Place of death missing
Footballers from Flemish Brabant